is a Japanese athletics competitor competing in the javelin throw. In 2007, she competed in the women's javelin throw event at the 2007 World Championships in Athletics held in Osaka, Japan. She did not qualify to compete in the final.

In 2004, she finished in 9th place in the women's javelin throw at the 2004 World Junior Championships in Athletics held in Grosseto, Italy. She won the bronze medal in the women's javelin throw event at the 2009 East Asian Games held in Hong Kong.

References

External links 
 

Living people
1985 births
Place of birth missing (living people)
Japanese female javelin throwers
World Athletics Championships athletes for Japan
Japan Championships in Athletics winners
21st-century Japanese women